The St. Joseph Catholic Mission Church (also known as the Port St. Joe Garden Club) is a historic site in Port St. Joe, Florida, located at 216 8th Street. On July 31, 1998, it was added to the U.S. National Register of Historic Places.

References

External links

 Gulf County listings at National Register of Historic Places
 Florida's Office of Cultural and Historical Programs
 Gulf County listings 
 Port St. Joe Garden Club

Buildings and structures in Gulf County, Florida
Churches on the National Register of Historic Places in Florida
Catholic missions
Former Roman Catholic church buildings in Florida
Churches in Florida
National Register of Historic Places in Gulf County, Florida
Port St. Joe, Florida